Viačasłaŭ Uładzimieravič Adamčyk (1 November 1933 – 5 August 2001) was a Belarusian journalist, writer, playwright and screenwriter.

He worked in the newspaper The Banner of Youth (1957–1958) and For the Return to their Homeland (1958–1960). He was then editor of the BSSR State Publishing House (1960–1962), and editor of the journalism magazine Polymya (1962–1963). He graduated from the higher literature courses at the Writers' Union in Moscow in 1965. He then worked for the magazine Neman (1965–1967), and was head of the editorial board of Polymya (1967–1969). He was deputy chief editor of the magazine Youth, where he worked from 1969 to 1977. He participated in the XXXVIII General Assembly of the United Nations in 1983.

He made his debut in 1952 with poetry, but his first story was published in 1957. He was the author of the collections of prose The Insider (1958), The Milky Way (1960), A Moment Flashes (1965), The Wild Dove (1972), Day Early Fall (1974). His 1978 novel, Strange Homeland was acclaimed in Belarus, and won the BSSR State Prize. He also authored several documentaries.

References

1933 births
2001 deaths
People from Dzyatlava District
People from Nowogródek Voivodeship (1919–1939)
Belarusian journalists
Belarusian screenwriters
Belarusian dramatists and playwrights
Belarusian novelists
20th-century novelists
20th-century dramatists and playwrights
Belarusian male writers
Male journalists
Male dramatists and playwrights
Male screenwriters
Belarusian male poets
20th-century poets
Soviet male poets
Soviet poets
20th-century male writers
20th-century Belarusian writers
Recipients of the Byelorussian SSR State Prize
20th-century screenwriters
20th-century journalists